Tobias Bogner (born May 28, 1990) is a German ski jumper. He debuted in the World Cup in the team competition in Willingen on February 11, 2007.

References

External links
 http://www.kombiundspezinachwuchs.de/Bognerprofil.htm

Living people
1990 births
German male ski jumpers
People from Sonthofen
Sportspeople from Swabia (Bavaria)